These are the Billboard magazine number-one albums of 1955, per the Billboard albums chart.

Chart history through August 6

Chart history August 13 to August 27 (no album chart)

Chart history September 3 to December 3

Chart history December 10 to end of year (no album chart)

See also
1955 in music
List of number-one albums (United States)

References

1955
United States Albums